Norman St. Clair (1865 - March 6, 1912) was a British-born American architect and painter. Born in England, he lived in Boston before opening a studio in Pasadena, California, where he painted many watercolors. He was also an architect, although he spent the remaining decade of his life dedicating himself to his paintings. By the time of his death, St. Clair had become "one of Southern California's best known artists."

References

1865 births
1912 deaths
English emigrants to the United States
Artists from Pasadena, California
American watercolorists
Architects from Pasadena, California
Painters from California
20th-century American painters